In the mathematical field of quantum topology, the Reshetikhin–Turaev invariants (RT-invariants) are a family of quantum invariants of framed links.
Such invariants of framed links also give rise to invariants of 3-manifolds via the Dehn surgery construction. These invariants were discovered by Nicolai Reshetikhin and Vladimir Turaev in 1991, and were meant to be a mathematical realization of Witten's proposed invariants of links and 3-manifolds using quantum field theory.

Overview

To obtain an RT-invariant, one must first have a -linear ribbon category at hand. Each -linear ribbon category comes equipped with a diagrammatic calculus in which morphisms are represented by certain decorated framed tangle diagrams, where the initial and terminal objects are represented by the boundary components of the tangle. Given any closed oriented 3-manifold , there exists a framed link  in the 3-sphere  so that  is homeomorphic to the manifold  obtained by surgering  along . Reshetikhin and Turaev  used this idea to construct invariants of 3-manifolds by combining certain RT-invariants into an expression which is invariant under Kirby moves. Such invariants of 3-manifolds are known as Witten–Reshetikhin–Turaev invariants (WRT-invariants).

Examples

Let  be a ribbon Hopf algebra over a field  (one can take, for example, any quantum group over ). That is,  is a -linear ribbon category.

For the quantum group   over the field , the corresponding RT-invariant for links and 3-manifolds gives rise to the following family of link invariants, appearing in skein theory. Then 

where the -tuple,  denotes the Kauffman polynomial of the link , where each of the  components is cabled by the Jones–Wenzl idempotent , a special element of the Temperley–Lieb algebra.

To define the corresponding WRT-invariant for 3-manifolds, first of all we choose  to be either a -th root of unity or an -th root of unity with odd . Assume that  is obtained by doing Dehn surgery on a framed link . Then the RT-invariant for the 3-manifold  is defined to be 

Roughly speaking, the first and second bracket ensure that  is invariant under blowing up/down (first Kirby move) and the third bracket ensures that  is invariant under handle sliding (second Kirby move).

Properties

The Witten–Reshetikhin–Turaev invariants for 3-manifolds satisfy the following properties:
  where  is the manifold  with opposite orientation, and  denotes the complex conjugate of 
 
These three properties coincide with the properties satisfied by the 3-manifold invariants defined by Witten using Chern–Simons theory (under certain normalization)

Open problems

Witten's asymptotic expansion conjecture
Pick .

Conjecture: 

Volume conjecture for the Reshetikhin–Turaev invariant 

Conjecture:
Let  be a closed oriented hyperbolic 3-manifold. Then for a suitable choice of arguments, 

where  is odd positive integer.

References

External links 
https://ncatlab.org/nlab/show/Reshetikhin-Turaev+construction

Quantum groups
Quantum field theory